The 1941 Taça de Portugal Final was the final match of the 1940–41 Taça de Portugal, the 3rd season of the Taça de Portugal, the premier Portuguese football cup competition organized by the Portuguese Football Federation (FPF). The match was played on 22 June 1941 at the Campo das Salésias in Lisbon, and opposed two Primeira Liga sides: Belenenses and Sporting CP. Sporting CP defeated Belenenses 4–1 to claim their first Taça de Portugal.

Match

Details

References

1941
Sporting CP matches
C.F. Os Belenenses matches
Taca